1410 Margret, provisional designation , is an Eoan asteroid from the outer regions of the asteroid belt, approximately 21 kilometers in diameter. It was discovered on 8 January 1937, by astronomer Karl Reinmuth at the Heidelberg Observatory in southwest Germany. The asteroid was named after Margret Braun, wife of the Heidelberg astronomer Heinrich Vogt.

Orbit and classification 

Margret is a member of the Eos family, the largest asteroid family in the outer main belt consisting of nearly 10,000 asteroids.

It orbits the Sun at a distance of 2.7–3.3 AU once every 5 years and 3 months (1,917 days). Its orbit has an eccentricity of 0.11 and an inclination of 10° with respect to the ecliptic.

Physical characteristics 

The asteroid's spectral type is unknown. The Eos family typically consists of K-type asteroids.

Diameter and albedo 

According to the survey carried out by the NEOWISE mission of NASA's Wide-field Infrared Survey Explorer, Margret measures 21.083 kilometers in diameter and its surface has an albedo of 0.145, which agrees with the albedo of 0.14 measured for the parent body of the Eos family, 221 Eos.

Rotation period 

As of 2017, no rotational lightcurve of Margret has been obtained from photometric observations. The asteroid's rotation period, spin axis and shape remain unknown.

Naming 

This minor planet was named after Margret Braun (died 1991), wife of the Heidelberg astronomer Heinrich Vogt (1890–1968), after whom  was named. The subsequently numbered asteroid  is also named after Margret Braun. The official naming citation was mentioned in The Names of the Minor Planets by Paul Herget in 1955.

References

External links 
 SDSS image on 04FEB2005 Fermats Brother
 Asteroid Lightcurve Database (LCDB), query form (info )
 Dictionary of Minor Planet Names, Google books
 Asteroids and comets rotation curves, CdR – Observatoire de Genève, Raoul Behrend
 Discovery Circumstances: Numbered Minor Planets (1)-(5000) – Minor Planet Center
 
 

001410
Discoveries by Karl Wilhelm Reinmuth
Named minor planets
19370108